The  is an eighteenth-century house near the Royal Palace of El Pardo which is set in a hunting estate north of Madrid.

History
The building was designed by the neoclassical architect Juan de Villanueva for the use of the heir to the Spanish throne Charles, Prince of Asturias.  Construction began in 1784.

Villanueva had previously designed another building known as the Casita del Príncipe for the same client at El Escorial.  The word casita is the diminutive of the Spanish word for "house".  Such buildings gave their royal occupants the opportunity to escape some of the formalities of court life.  The Petit Trianon at Versailles offers a French example of the phenomenon.

The building is administered by the Patrimonio Nacional. Following restoration work in the early twenty-first century, the building is open to the public by prior arrangement. The artwork inside includes a fresco by Francisco Bayeu y Subías.

References

Juan de Villanueva buildings
Royal residences in Spain
Buildings and structures in Fuencarral-El Pardo District, Madrid
El Pardo